Ion Rudeanu was a Romanian fencer. He competed in the team foil and épée events at the 1928 Summer Olympics.

References

External links
 

Year of birth missing
Possibly living people
Romanian male épée fencers
Romanian male foil fencers
Olympic fencers of Romania
Fencers at the 1928 Summer Olympics